Sorbus velebitica is a species of plant in the family Rosaceae. It is endemic to Croatia.

References

Sources

velebitica
Data deficient plants
Endemic flora of Croatia
Taxonomy articles created by Polbot